William Noble Imrie (4 March 1908 – 26 December 1944) was a Scottish footballer who played as a right half.

Career
Born in Methil, Imrie played club football for St Johnstone, Blackburn Rovers, Newcastle United, Swansea Town and Swindon Town. He made two appearances for Scotland in 1929 whilst a St Johnstone player, and scored one goal against Germany.

He later became a butcher, before joining the British Army's 5th Battalion Coldstream Guards during World War II. He developed cancer whilst on active duty and died in Fife in 1944. One of only five Swindon players who died serving during the war, he is included on the club's commemorative plaque unveiled in 2014.

References

1908 births
1944 deaths
Scottish footballers
Scotland international footballers
Scottish Junior Football Association players
Footballers from Fife
People from Methil
St Johnstone F.C. players
Blackburn Rovers F.C. players
Newcastle United F.C. players
Swansea City A.F.C. players
Swindon Town F.C. players
Scottish Football League players
English Football League players
Association football wing halves
Coldstream Guards soldiers
British Army personnel killed in World War II
East Fife F.C. wartime guest players
Military personnel from Fife